Roberts is a Latvian masculine given name, cognate of the English given name Robert and may refer to:
Roberts Akmens (1996), Latvian sportsman and canoeist 
Roberts Ancāns (1919–1962), Latvian Obersturmführer in the Waffen SS during World War II
Roberts Blossom (1924–2011), American theater, film and television actor and poet
 Roberts Žanis Briesma-Briesme (1891–1941), Latvian military officer and army commander 
Roberts Bukarts (born 1990), Latvian professional ice hockey forward
Roberts Dambītis (1881–1957), Latvian soldier and politician, Latvian rifleman, founder of the National Soldiers' Union, one of the principal commanders of Latvian War of Independence 
Roberts Dunstan (1922–1989), Australian soldier and airman of the Second World War
Roberts Gaigals (1913–1982), Latvian Waffen-Obersturmführer in the Latvian Legion during World War II
Roberts Gobziņš (born 1964), Latvian musician, DJ, MC, radio personality
Roberts Jekimovs (born 1989), Latvian ice hockey forward
Roberts Kļaviņš (1885–1941), Latvian military officer and General
Roberts Ķīlis (born 1968), Latvian politician and social anthropologist
Roberts Lapainis (1913–1947), Latvian ice hockey goaltender and Olympic competitor
Roberts Lipsbergs (born 1994), Latvian ice hockey centre
Roberts Mežeckis (born 1981), Latvian professional footballer and manager
Roberts Mūrnieks (1952–1991), Latvian independence activist 
Roberts Osis, (1900–1973), Latvian military officer, leader of the 43th grenadier regiment, one of the principal commanders of Battle of More, one of the principal perpetrators of Rumbula massacre
Roberts Ozols (1905–2002), Latvian cyclist
Roberts Pakalns (1911–1986), Latvian footballer and manager
Roberts Plūme (1897–1956), Latvian cyclist and cross-country skier 
 Roberts Rubenis (1917-1944), lieutenant in the Latvian Army, Latvian legionnaire and a commander of the Kureļa group battalion
 Roberts Sēlis (1884-1975), Latvian writer
Roberts Skadats (born 1948), Latvian footballer
Roberts Štelmahers (born 1974), Latvian professional basketball player
Roberts Uldriķis (born 1998), Latvian footballer
Roberts Vaux (1786–1836), American jurist, abolitionist, and philanthropist
Roberts Vidžus (born 1992), Latvian sprinter
Roberts Zīle (born 1958), Latvian economist and politician

Latvian masculine given names
Surnames from given names